Titanium is a chemical element with symbol Ti and atomic number 22.

Titanium may also refer to:

The chemical element titanium
Titanium (native), a natural occurrence of titanium
Isotopes of titanium
Titanium alloy

Titanium dioxide, the naturally occurring oxide of titanium, also known as titanium white

Music
Titanium (band), a New Zealand boy-band formed in 2012
"Titanium" (song), a song by David Guetta and Sia in 2011
Tony Titanium (American rapper and producer), alias name of Anthony Ian Berkeley, better known as Too Poetic, also known as Grym Reaper.

Other uses
Appcelerator Titanium, a platform for developing mobile and desktop software
Titanium (malware), advanced backdoor APT, developed by PLATINUM 
Titanium Metals, a manufacturer of titanium-based products

See also

 Tytanium (album), 2009 album by Sonny Seeza
 Itanium, Intel microprocessor architecture
 
 
 Ti (disambiguation)
 Titan (disambiguation)
 Thaitanium Thai-American hip hop music group